The Nicholas Vreeland Outkitchen is a historic stone building located at 52 Jacksonville Road in the Towaco section of the township of Montville in Morris County, New Jersey. Built , it was documented by the Historic American Buildings Survey in 1938. It was added to the National Register of Historic Places on December 11, 2009, for its significance in architecture. The building contributes to the domestic architecture theme of the Dutch Stone Houses in Montville, New Jersey Multiple Property Submission (MPS).

See also
 National Register of Historic Places listings in Morris County, New Jersey

References

External links
 
 

		

Montville, New Jersey
Buildings and structures in Morris County, New Jersey
National Register of Historic Places in Morris County, New Jersey
1780 establishments in New Jersey
New Jersey Register of Historic Places
Historic American Buildings Survey in New Jersey
Stone buildings in the United States